Izzi is a local government area of Ebonyi State in Nigeria.

Izzi, as in the case of Abakaliki the capital city, is a center of agricultural trade including such products as yams, cassava, rice, and both palm oil and palm kernels. It is also known for its local lead, zinc, salt, and limestone mining or quarrying. There are also isolated poultry and egg production farms across the state.

Its Local Government Headquarters is located at Iboko. Iboko is a commercial market of a carrying capacity of 5000 to 15000 people. In the old Ebonyi, she was prominent to have housed and served neighboring local governments, Ezza, Ikwo, Ngbo (Ohaukwu), and boundary neighbors in Cross River. Though the market is a weekly market, it still serve her purpose. Government policies on local markets in Ebonyi especially in Abakaliki  has helped to reduce the number of people and interests of buyers and sellers as it was in the old Ebonyi. The same can be traced to the removal of the old mobility, Iboko transports.

In politics, she accounts for the highest number of the electoral votes in the State. This only accruing to her large population and en masse electoral voting.

References 

Local Government Areas in Ebonyi State
Populated places in Ebonyi State